Paracles lateralis is a moth of the subfamily Arctiinae first described by Francis Walker in 1855. It is found in Brazil.

References

Moths described in 1855
Paracles